This is a list of regions of Guatemala by Human Development Index as of 2021.

Human development Index by Region

Human development Index by Departament

References 

Guatemala
Human Development Index
Regions of Guatemala by Human Development Index